Yours Truly is an album by the American hardcore punk band Sick of It All. It was released in 2000 on Fat Wreck Chords.

Critical reception
AllMusic wrote: "Pure grit and growl swirl among speed metal guitar licks and thunderous percussion, Sick of It All twists the new millennium punk revival backward to achieve what once was an intimidating scene for music."

Track listing
All tracks written by Sick of It All.
"Blown Away" –  2:32
"Nails" –  1:47
"The Bland Within" –  2:10
"Hello Pricks" –  2:53
"District" –  3:26
"Disco Sucks Fuck Everything" –  2:12
"America" –  2:15
"Hands Tied Eyes Closed" –  2:17
"Turn My Back" –  2:07
"Broke Dick" –  0:48
"Souvenir" –  3:31
"Cruelty" –  2:29
"This Day and Age" –  1:30
"Ruin" –  2:54
"Cry for Help" –  1:43
"No Apologies" –  3:47

Credits
Lou Koller – vocals
Pete Koller – guitar
Craig "Ahead" Setari – bass guitar
Armand Majidi – drums
Recorded at Show Place Studios, Dover, New Jersey
Produced and engineered by Steve Evetts

References

2000 albums
Fat Wreck Chords albums
Albums produced by Steve Evetts
Sick of It All albums